San Rafael del Yuma is a municipality located in the La Altagracia province of the Dominican Republic.  It has a population of approximately 46,687 in 2012. The ruins of Juan Ponce de León's residence are located on a plateau located three kilometers from San Rafael de Yuma.  The municipality is located 10 kilometers from Boca de Yuma.

Climate

Sectors
The city is divided into 16 sectors that are,

Banda Abajo
Bayahíbe
Bejucal Abajo
Boca del Yuma
Cabo Falso
Coral
Gato
Jaragua Abajo
La Piñita
Las Joyas del Mar
Mata Chalupe
Punta Papayo
San José del Yuma
San Rafael
Yuma Abajo
Yuma Arriba

References 

Populated places in La Altagracia Province
Municipalities of the Dominican Republic